Theertha Karaiyinile is a 1987 Indian Tamil-language drama film directed by Manivannan. The film stars Mohan and Rupini. It was released on 11 September 1987. The film was remade in Telugu as Varasudochadu (1988).

Plot 
Ganesan an unemployed man, once met with an accident and was admitted to the hospital. There, he meets a TB patient, Raghu, who is going to die in few days; both of them become good friends. Raghu tells Ganesan regarding his past that he is the son of his mother Chellathayee , a major landlord in a village. Raghu used to do a lot of mischief in his childhood; one day his friend Seenu died because of his mistake and he ran away from home. After listening to his story, Ganesan tells him to go back to his village, but since he will not live for many days, he sends Ganesan in his place.

Ganesan reaches the village as Raghu, everyone accepts him as Raghu expect two uncles, who are eagerly waiting for their mother-in-law's property. They try in many ways to eliminate Raghu / Ganesan but fail, finally, they want to make any one of their daughters marriage with him. Meanwhile, Raghu / Ganesan falls in love with a girl Pooncholai, sister of Seenu, whom Raghu killed in childhood. In the beginning, she hates him but after knowing the truth, she also starts love him. Arulvakku aiyasami, who knows the entire story regarding Ganesan and Raghu comes to the village and starts blackmailing Raghu / Ganesan. At the same time, the original Raghu also enters the village to spend his last days with his mother.

Meanwhile, those two uncles start torturing Pooncholai, to remove her from Raghu / Ganesan's life. Simultaneously, Raghu is in his last minutes, even then he sends Ganesan to protect Pooncholai. Mom chellathayi listens to everything and learns who is her original son. Finally, Ganesan saves Pooncholai, reveals the truth to everyone, Mom chellathayi accepts Ganesan also as her son and Raghu dies, leaving his mother's responsibility to Ganesan.

Cast 
Mohan as Ganesan (Raja)
Rupini as Poonjolai
Senthil
Janagaraj as Panchayat
Vinu Chakravarthy as Sarasu's Husband
Malaysia Vasudevan as Kova Sarala's husband
Vennira Aadai Moorthy as 'Arul Vaakku' Ayyasamy
Vasanth as Ganesan
Thyagu as Village President
Ganthimathi as Chellathayi
Kovai Sarala as  Sarasu's sister
Vijaya Chandrika as Sarasu

Production 
During filming, Rupini, who is not a native Tamil speaker, had difficulties with the lengthy dialogues, but managed to Manivannan's satisfaction.

Soundtrack 
The music was composed by Ilaiyaraaja. The title song is set to the raga Shubhapantuvarali.

Reception 
N. Krishnaswamy of The Indian Express called the film "well told". Jayamanmadhan of Kalki, however, reviewed the film more negatively.

References

External links 
 

1980s Tamil-language films
1987 drama films
1987 films
Films directed by Manivannan
Films scored by Ilaiyaraaja
Indian drama films
Tamil films remade in other languages